Nogaret is a commune in the Haute-Garonne department in southwestern France.

Population

See also
Guillaume de Nogaret
Jean Louis de Nogaret de La Valette
Communes of the Haute-Garonne department

References

Communes of Haute-Garonne